The Medal of Gratitude is a medal awarded by the President of Albania.

Notable recipients
 Richard Gere
 Pietro Mennea
 Warren L. Miller
 James G. Stavridis
 Deborah Wagner, (Land O'Lakes Country Director) 
 Robert Elsie, scholar and Albanologist 
 Ramón Sánchez Lizarralde, famous translator and Albanologist
 Karsten Ankjær Jensen, former Danish ambassador to Albania 
 Florian Raunig, former Austrian ambassador to Albania
 Nine US soldiers killed in C-130 Hercules crash

See also 
Orders, decorations and medals of Albania

References 

Orders, decorations, and medals of Albania